Risso is a village or populated centre in the Soriano Department of western Uruguay.

Geography

History
On 13 May 1971, the status of the populated centre here was elevated to "Pueblo" (village) by the Act of Ley Nº 13.959.

Population
In 2011 Risso had a population of 557.
 
Source: Instituto Nacional de Estadística de Uruguay

References

External links
INE map of Risso

Populated places in the Soriano Department